Patrick George Considine (born 5 September 1973) is an English actor, director, and screenwriter. He frequently collaborates with filmmaker/director Shane Meadows. He has received two British Academy Film Awards, three Evening Standard British Film Awards, British Independent Film Awards and a Silver Lion for Best Short Film at the 2007 Venice Film Festival.

His first major onscreen appearance was in his first collaboration with Meadows in A Room for Romeo Brass (1999) in which he played the small-town disturbed character Morell. His first lead role as love-struck misfit Alfie in Paweł Pawlikowski’s Last Resort (2000) won him the Best Actor award at the Thessaloniki Film Festival. Through the early 2000s he had leading performances in both In America (2003) and My Summer of Love (2004), and supporting parts in Doctor Sleep (2002) and 24 Hour Party People (2002). His role as Richard in Meadows' revenge film Dead Man's Shoes (2004), a film he cowrote, won him the 2005 Empire Award for Best British Actor and a nomination for the British Independent Film Award for Best Actor.

On television, Considine has had lead roles in several productions including; Pu-239 (2006), My Zinc Bed (2008), Red Riding (2009) and the BBC series Informer (2018), starring in the title role as Detective Inspector Jack Whicher in The Suspicions of Mr Whicher series of television films. As well as smaller recurring roles in series 3 of the BBC gangster series Peaky Blinders (2016), and the HBO miniseries The Outsider (2020). Considine starred alongside Jude Law in the Sky Atlantic miniseries The Third Day (2020). In 2022, he starred in the HBO Game of Thrones prequel series House of the Dragon.

Considine made his filmmaking debut with the short film Dog Altogether (2007), for which wrote and directed and for which he won a BAFTA Award for Best Short Film, a British Independent Film Award, a Silver Lion at the 2007 Venice Film Festival, and the Seattle International Film Festival Short Film Jury Award (Narrative Special Jury Prize) and its 2011 feature film adaptation Tyrannosaur which won a second for BAFTA for Outstanding Debut by a British Writer, Director or Producer and a British Independent Film Award at the 2011 Sundance Film Festival and acting awards for both its lead actors Olivia Colman and Peter Mullan. He followed this up by directing and starring in his second feature Journeyman to critical acclaim. He has also appeared in several music videos, including Coldplay's "God Put a Smile upon Your Face" and the Arctic Monkeys' "Leave Before the Lights Come On".

Despite portraying Banquo in the 2015 film adaptation of Macbeth, Considine has only had a very brief career on stage. He received Olivier Awards and Tony Award nominations as Best Actor in 2018 and 2019 for his performances in The Ferryman at the Royal Court Theatre, at the Gielgud Theatre, and at the Bernard B. Jacobs Theatre on Broadway.

Early life
Considine was born in Burton upon Trent, Staffordshire, where he still resides. He grew up with his brother and four sisters in a council estate in Winshill, a village of Burton. His father, Martin Joseph Considine, was Irish. Considine attended, among other schools, Abbot Beyne Senior School and Burton College. In 1990, he enrolled to do a National Diploma in Performing Arts at Burton College, where he first met Shane Meadows.

In 1994, Considine moved away to study photography at the University of Brighton. While there he studied under social documentarian Paul Reas, who described one project, portraits of Considine's parents in their house in Winshill, as "fucking brilliant". At one point, Considine was threatened with expulsion, but graduated with a first-class BA.

Acting career
After graduating from university, Meadows cast Considine in several short films, as well as his second film, A Room for Romeo Brass (1999). Considine, in his screen debut, played the disturbed character Morell. Considine's performance in the film led to Paweł Pawlikowski casting him in his first starring role in Last Resort (2000). Considine played the love-struck misfit Alfie, for which he won the Best Actor award at the Thessaloniki Film Festival. Considine increased his profile during the early to mid-2000s with supporting and starring roles in cult films such as 24 Hour Party People and In America.

In 2004, Considine starred in what was then the most significant role of his career, as Richard in Meadows' revenge film Dead Man's Shoes (2004), a film he cowrote and for which he won the Best British Actor Award at the 2005 Empire Awards. In the same year, he starred in My Summer of Love, his second film with director Pawel Pawlikowski. Both films were recognised on the award circuit, where Considine earned five nominations and two wins. The following year, Considine played Frank Thorogood (the suspected murderer of Rolling Stones co-founder Brian Jones) in Stoned (2005). It was around this time that Considine earned his reputation as a popular portrayer of cinema villains, antiheroes, and darker characters. 2005 also saw the release of Considine's second Hollywood film, Cinderella Man.

Considine appeared in the Spanish thriller Bosque de Sombras (2006). It was during the filming of this that Considine penned what later became his debut short, Dog Altogether. Considine claims that it was his co-star Gary Oldman who gave him the confidence to make the film, which led to him thanking Oldman during his BAFTA acceptance speech. In 2006, he starred in Pu-239 as Timofey Berezin, a worker at a Russian nuclear facility who gets exposed to a lethal dose of radiation. In 2007, Considine landed roles in two popular big-budget films; the third film in the Bourne Trilogy film series, The Bourne Ultimatum, in which he played newspaper reporter Simon Ross, and Hot Fuzz, in which he had his first comedic role as DS Andy Wainwright. In 2008, Considine starred in My Zinc Bed a TV film for BBC / HBO. In 2009, he starred as Peter Hunter in the Channel 4 miniseries Red Riding: 1980, based on the novels by David Peace, and another collaboration with Meadows, Le Donk & Scor-zay-zee, a film which was unscripted, adlibbed, and filmed in five days at a cost of £48,000, and which premiered at the Edinburgh International Film Festival.

In 2011, Considine starred in a film adaptation of Joe Dunthorne's book Submarine, which Richard Ayoade wrote and directed. Also in 2011, Considine appeared as Porter Nash in the adaptation of the Ken Bruen novel Blitz, as well as starring as Jack Whicher in The Suspicions of Mr Whicher, written by Helen Edmundson and Neil McKay. In the same year, Considine was briefly reunited with one of his A Room for Romeo Brass co-stars, BAFTA-winning actress Vicky McClure. The two shared the screen in a television advert to promote "Films for Life Season". The ad was shot over two days in Spain.

He has appeared in several music videos, most notably "God Put A Smile Upon Your Face" (2002) by Coldplay and Moloko's "Familiar Feeling" (2003), as well as the Arctic Monkeys track "Leave Before the Lights Come On" (2006), for which he wrote the video.

Considine starred in The World's End, as one of the "Five Musketeers" reattempting an "epic" pub crawl. Considine previously worked with the cast and crew on Hot Fuzz (2007). The film was released in the United Kingdom on 19 July 2013, and the United States on 23 August 2013. In August 2015, Considine confirmed that he was writing the screenplay for the film Journeyman, in which he will also star. It is an adaptation of non-fiction novel The Years of the Locust by Jon Hotten, the true story of a sociopathic boxing promoter, Fat Rick Parker, and his doomed relationship with his naive fighter, Tim Anderson. Considine is also writing a film from a ghost story called The Leaning, with plans to direct both films. He will continue to work with Shane Meadows on King of the Gypsies, a biopic of bare-knuckle fighter Bartley Gorman, whom Considine met and became friends with whilst working as a photographer. In 2015, Considine was cast along Glenn Close, Gemma Arterton in the UK zombie film in The Girl with All the Gifts, based on the 2014 novel The Girl with All the Gifts by M. R. Carey.

In April 2017, Considine made his professional stage debut in The Ferryman at the Royal Court Theatre, ahead of a transfer to the Gielgud Theatre in the West End.

The production transferred to the Bernard B. Jacobs Theatre on Broadway, beginning previews on 2 October 2018. The play, which went on to win four Tony Awards, closed on 7 July 2019. For his performance as Quinn Carney Considine gained nominations for best actor at both the Olivier Awards and The Tony Awards. In 2020, he portrayed Mr Martin in the HBO Mini-Series The Third Day alongside Jude Law.

In August 2022, Considine began appearing as King Viserys Targaryen in the Game of Thrones series prequel House of the Dragon. Considine will portray Brendan Ingle in the upcoming biographical sports drama Giant opposite Mena Massoud as Naseem Hamed.

Filmmaking career
In 2007, Paddy Considine wrote and directed the short film Dog Altogether, starring Peter Mullan, partially based on Considine's father. Dog Altogether won the 2007 BAFTA award for Best Short Film, as well as a Silver Lion for Best Short Film at the 2007 Venice Film Festival, a Best British Short at the 2007 British Independent Film Awards (BIFA), and the Seattle International Film Festival Short Film Jury Award (Narrative Special Jury Prize), as well as a World Cinema Directing Award for his feature directorial debut Tyrannosaur at the 2011 Sundance Film Festival.

Musical career
After a short stint during college in a virtual comedy thrash group called 'Grunt', Considine and Shane Meadows formed the band She Talks To Angels (inspired by the Black Crowes song of the same name) with friends Richard Eaton, Simon Hudson, and Nick Hemming (later of  The Leisure Society), with Meadows as vocalist and Considine as drummer. Considine left the band, the remaining members re-formed, calling themselves Oslo. Appearing on Jools Holland's show, whilst Considine had moved on to study photography at the University of Brighton, where he formed a new group, a Britpop band called Pedestrians. His rock band called Riding the Low, released an EP They Will Rob You of Your Gifts (2009), and an album What Happened to the Get To Know Ya? (2013).

Considine and Riding the Low got their big music break in 2014 after Tim Burgess of the Charlatans invited them to perform at his curated Tim Peaks Diner event at Festival No 6 in Portmeirion, Wales. Considine had contacted Burgess after reading his book Telling Stories, to discuss meditation. "The conversation developed and Tim generously offered to let us play at Portmeirion, It led to the band supporting the Charlatans at the O2 Academy in Leicester this year. I didn't get stage fright. We were ready. We did our history off-camera. We have evolved. We have got better. At first, it was raw – all we had was arrogance. We had a long way to go and we learnt our craft at all these pub gigs. We didn't expect a leg-up just because an actor is in the band." said Considine

2016 saw the band release their second full-length album Are Here to Help the Neighbourhood, recorded in Rockfield Studios and produced by Bassist Chris Slusarenko of Boston Spaceships and Guided By Voices. Considine penned the words while the band wrote the music.

Personal life
Considine remains private in his personal life and once said if he ever became a celebrity, he would "disappear and go and make shoes like Daniel Day-Lewis" (a reference to Day-Lewis' sabbatical working as a shoemaker in Italy). In 2002, Considine married Shelley Insley, with whom he has been in a relationship since he was 18. They have three children. Considine still lives in his home town of Burton upon Trent with his family.

Health
In April 2011, then in his 30s, Considine revealed that he had been diagnosed with Asperger syndrome. Although initially reassured by the diagnosis, he continued to struggle in social situations until clinician Andrew Barton-Breck surmised he may have Irlen Syndrome. He was subsequently diagnosed by Helen Irlen herself in 2013 with Irlen syndrome, a condition in which the brain cannot adequately process visual stimuli. His condition has improved significantly since he began wearing purple Irlen filters, either as specially made contact lenses when on-set or as traditional tinted glasses.

Filmography

Film

Television

Theatre

Music videos

Awards and nominations

References

External links
 
 
 In his own words; Paddy Considine Interview
 Here comes the sun; Paddy Considine Interview
 Paddy Considine Interview

1973 births
20th-century English male actors
21st-century English male actors
Actors from Staffordshire
Alumni of Burton College
Alumni of the University of Brighton
English male film actors
English male television actors
English people of Irish descent
Living people
Outstanding Debut by a British Writer, Director or Producer BAFTA Award winners
People from Burton upon Trent
People with Asperger syndrome
Actors with autism
Theatre World Award winners